Auckland Law School is one of the eight faculties that make up the University of Auckland.  The Faculty of Law is located at the City Campus, between Waterloo Quadrant and Eden Crescent. It is in close proximity to the Auckland High Court. In 2020, Auckland Law School ranked 50th in the world and best in New Zealand on QS World University Rankings. The University of Auckland’s Faculty of Law is the largest of its kind in New Zealand. It boasts experts in a variety of fields, including commercial, public, human rights and environmental law.

History
The land (and some of the buildings) that the Faculty of Law now occupies were previously used by the High Court of New Zealand in Auckland. One courtroom has been retained unaltered for moots. Prior to this, the land was used by an aerated water manufacturer, Grey and Menzies.

The law school is accessible by a right of way, down a small hill from Waterloo Quadrant. Originally, this was only a mud track nicknamed the Ho Chi Minh Trail that was later paved when the Davis Law Library was completed, replacing Eden Crescent as the main entrance into the Law School grounds.

Until 1991, the Law school was based on the top three floors of the University Library building.

Davis Law Library
The Davis Law Library is named after Professor A. G. Davis, who retired as Dean of the Law School in 1965. The Library was founded at the University in 1939 and has had several locations, including a move into the General Library building in 1969. It has been in its current Eden Crescent location since 1992.

Student activities
Auckland Law School is the home of volunteer (pro-bono legal services) organisation, the Equal Justice Project. Founded in 2005 by students Eesvan Kirshnan and Peter Williams with the aim of promoting equal access to justice in Auckland. It is one of the largest pro bono organisations in New Zealand.

The University of Auckland Mooting Society was formed in 2014 and is the first society of its kind in New Zealand. Throughout the year the Society offers a variety of seminars and workshops to assist students with compulsory academic moots. The John Haigh Memorial Moot was established in 2014 in memory of John Haigh QC (LLB '71), a highly respected barrister and alumnus of Auckland Law School. The 2014 final was judged by Harrison, Toogood and Moore JJ in the Auckland High Court. The moot provides a valuable opportunity for third-year and above students to develop and enhance their advocacy skills. In 2020, the University of Auckland Mooting Society is one of the largest clubs at Auckland Law School. They run five prestigious moots aimed at facilitating and developing mooting and advocacy.

An elected student body, the Auckland University Law Students' Society, represents and advocates for law students and to help provide opportunities which complement legal studies. AULSS help organise social events such as "Steins", publication of the serious academic Law Review, an annual Law Revue, mooting competitions, and participation in sports and events such as the Round the Bays fun run. Law students traditionally dominate both competition and administration of both the Auckland University Debating Association and the Auckland Debating Association.

Te Rākau Ture (TRT) is the name of the Māori Law Students Association in which the rōpū initiates activities throughout the calendar year. Established in 1990, TRT has grown to play a very important role in the lives of Māori students who study at Auckland Law School. Each year the rōpū organise a number of events such as hosting a noho marae for Part II and above, a Haerenga visiting high schools outside of Auckland to promote coming to the Law School, plus their most popular hākari whakamutunga. They welcome everyone to join TRT and encourage members to participate in their events to meet other students and build support networks.

The Pacific Island Law Student’s Association more commonly referred to as PILSA, aims to provide a sense of identity and belonging among Pacific Island students at Auckland Law School. It also aims to promote educational achievement and to connect with Pacific communities outside of the university through various events organised throughout the year. The elected PILSA executive committee is a link between the PILSA members, the Pacific Students Faculty Adviser, the Faculty of Law and Pacific Island communities. The PILSA executive works closely with the Student Academic and Support Adviser (Pacific) to provide workshops, seminars and tutorials for PILSA members. PILSA encourages all students to join PILSA and participate in social events, sports-days, tutorials, seminars and the Pacific Islands Moot.

As of 2017, Auckland has been the national senior mooting champion for nine of the past ten years. It has therefore represented New Zealand at the most prestigious moot court competition in the world, the Philip C. Jessup International Law Moot, nine times in the past ten years. Highlights of Auckland's participation in the Jessup include a semi-final finish in 2012, and a Best Oralist award at the international rounds (Andrew Grant) in 2017.

Research
Auckland Law School is home to a number of research centres of excellence, including The Aotearoa New Zealand Centre for Indigenous Peoples and the Law, the New Zealand Centre for Environmental Law, the New Zealand Centre for ICT Law, the NZ Centre for Legal and Political Theory, The New Zealand Centre for Human Rights Law, Policy and Practice and the Research Centre for Business Law. It is also home to Te Tai Haruru – the Māori Legal Academics Group.

The LLB degree
In any given year, about half of Auckland Law School graduates take up positions in New Zealand law firms, while the other half begin their careers in other professional organisations. These include accounting and consulting firms; business and industry; national and local government; teaching, research and journalism; international, environmental and other non-government organisations.

In the third and forth year of the LLB, Part III and IV students will have over 50 elective courses to choose from. (including four taught in the January/February summer school) – the largest range of any New Zealand law faculty.

Although there isn't any requirement to major within the LLB degree students may choose to specialise in a particular area of interest, or if they would prefer, to choose from a wide range of different areas to cover a range of topics.

There is a growing array of electives with an international focus: in 2015 these include Aviation Law, International Human Rights, International Law, Law and IT, Financial Markets Law, Global Environmental Law, Immigration and Refugee Law, International Criminal Law, International Disputes Settlement and International Trade Law.

More than 90% of LLB students qualify with two degrees, either because they enter law school as graduates (15%) or because they undertake conjoint bachelor's degrees (75%). Conjoint combinations are BA/LLB, BCom/LLB, BDes/LLB, BE(Hons)/LLB, BFA/LLB, BGlobalSt/LLB, BHSc/LLB, BMus/LLB, BProp/LLB, BSc/LLB, BAdvSci(Hons)/LLB.

Postgraduate Studies
The Faculty of Law has a leading postgraduate programme offering opportunities for postgraduate legal research.

The Master of Laws (LLM) is designed to provide an advanced level of study for both full-time students and those who are legal practitioners or engaged in other full- or part-time employment. Students may concentrate their study in particular areas of specialisation, or study a broad range of legal subjects. The LLM programme offers six specialisations: Commercial and Corporate Law, Public Law, Environmental Law, Human Rights Law, International Law, and Litigation and Dispute Resolution.

The LLM undertaken by research offers graduates the opportunity to conduct in-depth research in an area of personal interest to enhance future employment opportunities either professionally or academically.

The LLM undertaken by coursework offers law graduates an opportunity to study areas in greater depth and complexity than within an undergraduate law degree, combining courses of sophistication and technical difficulty in terms of legal content with courses that contain relevant interdisciplinary subject matter and a focus on policy. Each course contains a significant research component, usually in the form of a 12,500 word research essay. The LLM also permits cross-disciplinary study in the form of one Masters course (30 points) from another faculty in the University of Auckland.

The Masters of Legal Studies (MLS) is for graduates who do not have a Law undergraduate degree but have a four-year degree or equivalent in another discipline and whose work involves legal issues and dealing with legislation. Completion of this degree will not satisfy the entry requirements for admission as a barrister and solicitor in New Zealand and is not a substitute for an LLB degree. The MLS suits professionals from non-legal backgrounds who find that their careers require some knowledge of legal matters, but do not necessarily want to practise law. Professionals who will particularly benefit include: Accountants and Auditors, Architects and Town Planners, Business Development Managers, Compliance Managers, Teachers, Engineers, IT professionals, Police and Public Sector Professionals.

A Doctor of Philosophy (PhD) in Law is a thesis-only research degree usually requiring full-time study for three to four years at The University of Auckland. The degree is undertaken under supervision and candidates must complete a sustained course of advanced legal research resulting in the production of a substantial original thesis. The degree is governed by the general University PhD regulations.

References

External links 
 Faculty Homepage
 Davis Law Library Homepage

Law School
Law schools in New Zealand